The Party of Industrialists and Entrepreneurs of Turkmenistan is a political party in Turkmenistan. The party originated in August 2012 as first legal opposition party in the country. On 10 June 2013 Party leader Ovezmammed Mammedov was elected to the Assembly of Turkmenistan in a by-election held for five vacant seats.

In December 2017 delegates at the second national party conference elected Saparmyrat Ovganov as the party's new leader.

Criticism 
The party supports the policy of President Gurbanguly Berdimuhamedow. According to critics, the party appeared only to create the illusion of multiparty elections.

Election results

Presidential elections

Legislative elections

References 

Political parties in Turkmenistan
Political parties established in 2012
2012 establishments in Turkmenistan